Skarpnäck is a Stockholm metro station located in the Skarpnäcksfältet subdistrict of Skarpnäcks Gård district, Skarpnäck borough.

The station is the southern terminus for the green line 17 and the easternmost Stockholm metro station (as of ). As of  it is still the newest station in the system. The underground Bagarmossen metro station was opened at the same time, but replaced an older station in Bagarmossen, which was closed on 8 July 1994.

The station artwork by American sculptor Richard Nonas consists of seventeen granite "benches" placed along the platform, as well as a red clinker floor and red-painted shotcrete walls alluding to the red brick buildings in Skarpnäck.

References

External links
Images of Skarpnäck

Green line (Stockholm metro) stations
Railway stations opened in 1994
1994 establishments in Sweden